The Japan–Palau relations refers to the diplomatic relations between Japan and Palau. Japan has an embassy in Koror while Palau has an embassy in Tokyo.

History

The bilateral ties between the two countries originated in 1920, when Japan assumed control over the island colonies of the German colonial empire in the Pacific which included present-day Micronesia, the Marshall Islands, the Northern Marianas and Palau. The islands became part of the South Seas Mandate under the League of Nations and Koror was designated as the administrative center of the mandate. Under Japanese rule, Palau experienced significant development of its fishing, agriculture and mining industry. Palau achieved self-sufficiency to some degree during the period. Palau also served as a Japanese military base during World War II. Japanese administration over the islands ended following the defeat of Japan in the World War II. The South Seas Mandate became the Trust Territory of the Pacific Islands and it was administrated by the United States.

Japan recognized the independence of Palau from the United States on 1 October 1994 and established formal relations with Palau during the same year on November 2. The Japanese embassy in Koror opened in 1999.

Cultural relations
As a former Japanese colony, Palau was influenced by Japanese culture and as a result, many older residents speak Japanese and it is an official language in the state of Angaur. Contemporary Palauan has many words derived from Japanese such as "daijobu", "okyaku", "denki" and "senkyo". Local cuisine has also been influenced by the Japanese.

Economic relations

Palau-based tuna shipping companies mainly export sashimi grade tuna to Japan. Licensing of fishing vessels from Japan remains a source of foreign exchange between Palau and Japan.

Palau has supported Japan's whaling rights in the past but has since abandoned its support in June 2010 in favor of catch quota proposal being considered by the International Whaling Commission. Johnson Toribiong asserted that his country's policy change won't affect Japan–Palau relations and claimed that Japan is "mature enough" to accept Palau's stand on whaling.

Security relations
Japan has sent the Japan Mine Action Service to Palau to clear World War II bombs sitting dormant in Palau's seabed. The clearing operations started in May 2013 and will take about a year and half.

Tourism
Tourism is one of Palau's main industries, with the majority of its tourists coming from Japan and Taiwan.

See also

Japanese settlement in Palau

References

External links 
 Embassy of Japan in Palau
 Embassy of Palau in Japan

 
Palau
Bilateral relations of Palau